Miloje Kljajević (born 10 September 1968) is a retired Serbian football defender.

References

1968 births
Living people
People from Bijelo Polje
Serbs of Montenegro
Serbian footballers
FK Partizan players
FK Sutjeska Nikšić players
Ionikos F.C. players
Panionios F.C. players
AEK Larnaca FC players
Association football defenders
Super League Greece players
Cypriot First Division players
Serbian football managers
Ionikos F.C. managers
Serbian expatriate footballers
Expatriate footballers in Greece
Serbian expatriate sportspeople in Greece
Expatriate footballers in Cyprus
Serbian expatriate sportspeople in Cyprus
Expatriate football managers in Greece